The men's snowboard halfpipe competition at the 2003 Asian Winter Games in Aomori, Japan was held on 2 February at the Ajigasawa Ski Area.

Schedule
All times are Japan Standard Time (UTC+09:00)

Results

Election

Final

References 

Qualification
Final

External links
Results at FIS website

Halfpipe